γ-Cyclodextrin sometimes abbreviated as γ-CD, is an octasaccharide derived from glucose. The α- (alpha), β- (beta), and γ- (gamma) cyclodextrins correspond to six, seven, and eight glucose units, respectively.

Structure

In γ-cyclodextrin, the eight glucose subunits are linked end to end via α-1,4 linkages.  The result has the shape of a tapered cylinder, with 8 primary alcohols on one face and 16 secondary alcohol groups on the other. The exterior surface of cyclodextrins is somewhat hydrophilic whereas the interior core is hydrophobic.

Physical properties
γ-Cyclodextrin exists as a white (colorless) powder or crystals. The density of its hydrate crystal (γCD·14H2O) is 1.41 g/cm3.  γ-Cyclodextrin is well soluble in water and dimethyl sulfoxide, poorly soluble in methanol.

Applications
γ-Cyclodextrins has the largest cavity size between natural cyclodextrin, thus, it is well-suited to accommodate larger biomolecules and other guests. For this reason, γ-cyclodextrin is most commonly used as a complexing agent. γ-Cyclodextrin is widely used in medicine, pharmacy, food industry, cosmetics, textiles.

Derivatives
To increase solubility, hydroxypropylated γ-cyclodextrin derivative (HPγCD) is obtained by treating the natural cyclodextrin with propylene oxide, and sulfobutylether γ-cyclodextrin (SBEγCD) by treating the natural CD with 1,4-butane sultone.
Sugammadex is the derivative of γ-cyclodextrin applied as a medication.

References

Oligosaccharides